The Brewster XA-32 was an American attack aircraft, a mid-wing type with an internal bomb bay. The prototype had the R-2800 engine, but it could take the intended R-4360 powerplant. After a dismal set of test results, the XA-32 did not enter production.

Design and development
Brewster Aeronautical Corporation's F2A Buffalo won the first Navy monoplane fighter competition over Grumman's entry. The company continued to design and produce lackluster aircraft, and the XA-32, despite a sound layout, became a compendium of management-induced faults. Missing production deadline dates and constant changes to the design jeopardized a promising design (at least on paper).

Initially designed in 1941, the XA-32 was grossly overweight, at almost , similar to the Douglas A-20 Havoc. The drag induced by its bulbous shape was amplified by careless detail design, which left it festooned with bumps and lumps. One disastrous characteristic was that the exhaust scoops that ringed the cowling nearly blinded the test pilots during night flying; the backfiring at low power settings resulted in flames engulfing the nose of the aircraft. Even with the  Pratt & Whitney R-2800, the XA-32 was underpowered and an attempt to re-engine the aircraft with the  Pratt & Whitney R-4360 Wasp Major was unsuccessful.

Testing
The first flight of the XA-32 prototype was not until May 22, 1943, two years after the design was proposed; and almost every aspect of performance fell short of the specifications. Devoid of weapons load, the XA-32 could only reach  and although handling was adequate, as soon as armament and external stores were added, the performance dropped drastically and more seriously, the disturbed airflow "set up severe buffeting at its top speed." The firm was in such management shambles that it drew the wrath of Congress and actually went out of the aircraft manufacturing business following the debacle of the XA-32.

Only two examples were built, the XA-32 (S/N 42-13568) and XA-32A ( S/N 42-13569), both of which were scrapped at the conclusion of flight testing.

Specifications (XA-32)

References

Notes

Bibliography

 McCullough, Anson. "Grind 'Em Out Ground Attack: The Search for the Elusive Fighter Bomber." Wings, Vol. 25, No. 4, August 1995.

External links

  Dave's War Birds - Brewster XA-32
 USAF National Museum - Brewster XA-32
 USAF National Museum - Brewster XA-32A

A-032
Brewster A-32
Single-engined tractor aircraft
Cancelled military aircraft projects of the United States
Mid-wing aircraft
Aircraft first flown in 1943